The chuck-will's-widow (Antrostomus carolinensis) is a nocturnal bird of the nightjar family Caprimulgidae. It is mostly found in the southeastern United States (with disjunct populations in Long Island, New York, Ontario, Canada and Cape Cod, Massachusetts) near swamps, rocky uplands, and pine woods. It migrates to the West Indies, Central America, and northwestern South America.

Taxonomy
The chuck-will's-widow was formally described in 1789 by the German naturalist Johann Friedrich Gmelin in his revised and expanded edition of Carl Linnaeus's Systema Naturae. He placed it with all the other nightjars in the genus Caprimulgus and coined the binomial name Caprimulgus carolinensis. Gmelin based his description on those of earlier authors including the "Goat-sucker of Carolina" that had been described and illustrated by the English naturalist Mark Catesby in his The Natural History of Carolina, Florida and the Bahama Islands  that was published between 1729 and 1732. Chuck-will's-widow is now placed with 11 other species in the genus Antrostomus that was erected by the French naturalist Charles Bonaparte in 1838. The generic name combines the Ancient Greek antron meaning "cavern" and stoma meaning "mouth". The specific epithet carolinensis is from the toponym Carolina. The type locality is South Carolina. The species is monotypic: no subspecies are recognised.

The common English name "chuck-will's-widow " is an onomatopoeia from the bird's song. Alternative names include "chuckwuts-widow" and "chip-fell-out-of-a-oak".

This bird is sometimes confused with the better-known whippoorwill (Antrostomus vociferus), because of their similar calls and unusual names. Though rather closely related, they are two distinct species.

Description
The chuck-will's-widow has a short bill and a long tail typical of the nightjars. It has mottled brownish underparts, a buff throat, reddish-brown feathers lined with black, and brown and white patterning on head and chest. Males have patches of white on their outer tail feathers. It is the largest nightjar in North America.

The repetitive song is often heard at night. It consists of a series of calls with a vibrating middle note between two shorter notes, not much shifting in pitch. It is slower, lower-pitched and less piercing than the song of the whip-poor-will.

Behavior and ecology

Diet
It eats primarily insects, particularly those active at night such as moths, beetles, and winged ants.  It will also eat small birds and bats, swallowing them whole.

Breeding
The eggs are laid on patches of dead leaves on the ground. They are pink with spots of brown and lavender and are incubated by the female.

Gallery

References

Sources

External links

 audubon.org
 Chuck-will's-widow – USGS Patuxent Bird Identification InfoCenter
 Chuck-will's-widow Species Account – Cornell Lab of Ornithology
 Chuck-will's-widow Bird Sound

Antrostomus
Nightjars
Birds of the United States
Birds of Hispaniola
Birds of the Dominican Republic
Chuck-will's-widow
Birds described in 1789
Taxa named by Johann Friedrich Gmelin